Oligodon erythrorhachis, the Namsang kukri snake, is a species of snake found in India (Arunachal Pradesh (Chessa - Papum Pare district) ).

References

 Smith, M.A. 1943 The Fauna of British India, Ceylon and Burma, Including the Whole of the Indo-Chinese Sub-Region. Reptilia and Amphibia. 3 (Serpentes). Taylor and Francis, London. 583 pp.
 Wall,F. 1910 A new snake from Assam (Oligodon erythrorachis). J. Bombay nat. Hist. Soc. 19: 923-924

erythrorhachis
Reptiles described in 1910